Carlos Clerc Martínez (born 21 February 1992) is a Spanish professional footballer who plays as a left-back for Elche CF.

Club career
Born in Badalona, Barcelona, Catalonia, Clerc finished his youth career with RCD Espanyol. He made his senior debut with the reserves in the 2010–11 season, in Tercera División.

Clerc made his first-team – and La Liga – debut on 26 September 2013, starting and playing 68 minutes in a 2–1 away loss against Villarreal CF. On 31 January of the following year, he was loaned to CE Sabadell FC of Segunda División until June.

On 28 January 2015, Clerc returned to Sabadell also in a temporary deal, after not featuring in any league matches for the Pericos in the first half of the campaign. On 15 July, he moved to fellow league team Girona FC in a season-long loan.

On 19 August 2016, Clerc signed a two-year contract with CA Osasuna, newly promoted to the top tier. He scored his first goal in the competition the following 9 January, in a 3–3 home draw with Valencia CF.

On 27 June 2019, free agent Clerc agreed to a three-year contract with Levante UD. In July 2022, after being relegated, he remained in the top division on a two-year deal at Elche CF.

Honours
Osasuna
Segunda División: 2018–19

References

External links

1992 births
Living people
People from Badalona
Sportspeople from the Province of Barcelona
Spanish footballers
Footballers from Catalonia
Association football defenders
La Liga players
Segunda División players
Segunda División B players
Tercera División players
CF Damm players
RCD Espanyol B footballers
RCD Espanyol footballers
CE Sabadell FC footballers
Girona FC players
CA Osasuna players
Levante UD footballers
Elche CF players